Blowback may refer to:

Firearms
Blowback (firearms), a system of operation for self-loading firearms that obtains energy from the motion of the cartridge case as it is pushed to the rear by expanding gases created by the ignition of the propellant charge
Blowback (intelligence), unintended consequences of a covert operation that are suffered by the civil population of the aggressor government
Blowback (forensics), vacuum effect created in the barrel of a firearm when it is discharged
Blowback, firearm discharge materials a concern for Shooting range#Common safety practices

Media and entertainment
Blowback (film), a 2000 film
Blowback (album), a 2001 album by rapper Tricky
"Blowback" (FlashForward), a 2010 FlashForward episode
"Blowback" (Justified), a 2010 episode of Justified
"Blowback" (Alias episode)
Blowback (Journeyman)
Blowback (NCIS)
Blowback (podcast), a podcast about American history and foreign policy
Blowback (The Shield)
Blowback Productions, an independent film and television production company founded in 1988 by Marc Levin. Along with producing partner, Daphne Pinkerson, they have made over 20 films and won numerous awards.

Other uses
 Blowback (steam engine), a type of failure, often catastrophic, of a steam engine
 Blowback, a 2009 bestselling military action thriller novel by former Indian Army officer Major Mukul Deva published by HarperCollins
Blowback, a 2013 spy novel by former United States CIA operations officer Valerie Plame
Blowback: The Costs and Consequences of American Empire, a 2000 nonfiction book by Chalmers Johnson
Another term for backscatter (email)
An aerodynamic phenomenon affecting helicopter rotors also called flap back